Ousmane Adama Ouattara (born 22 December 1993) is an Ivorian professional footballer who plays as a centre-back US Monastir  and the Ivory Coast national team.

Career
Ouattara began his senior career in the Ivory Coast with Séwé FC. After 5 years there, and a couple of Ivory Coast Ligue 1 titles he moved to the Egyptian club Smouha SC, followed with a stint at the Nigerian club Oyah Sports FC. He returned to the Ivory Coast with FC San Pédro. In the beginning of the 2019 season, he moved to the Congolese side AS Vita Club. He was named as AS Vita's best player of the year for the 2019-20 season.

International career
Ouattara debuted with the Ivory Coast national team in a 1–1 friendly tie with Zambia on 25 October 2014, scoring his side's only goal.

Honours
Séwé FC
 Ivory Coast Ligue 1: 2012–13, 2013–2014

References

External links

1993 births
Living people
People from Zanzan District
Ivorian footballers
Ivory Coast international footballers
Ivory Coast youth international footballers
Association football defenders
Smouha SC players
AS Vita Club players
Ligue 1 (Ivory Coast) players
Egyptian Premier League players
Ivorian expatriate footballers
Ivorian expatriate sportspeople in Egypt
Ivorian expatriate sportspeople in Nigeria
Ivorian expatriate sportspeople in the Democratic Republic of the Congo
Expatriate footballers in Egypt
Expatriate footballers in Nigeria
Expatriate footballers in the Democratic Republic of the Congo